Khalid ibn Urfuta was a military leader in the early Islamic conquest of Persia. He captured Valashabad, Weh Antiok Khusrau (al-Rumiyya) and Veh-Ardashir for the Rashidun Caliphate.

Arab generals
Arab Muslims
7th-century Arabs
Generals of the Rashidun Caliphate
Sahabah hadith narrators
People of the Muslim conquest of Persia